Football at Far Eastern Championship Games was the only major international football competition in Asia pre-World War II.  It was contested by China, Japan and the Philippines, with the Dutch East Indies joining the last edition of the tournament in 1934.

Although the Philippines won the first tournament, China achieved nine consecutive victories from the second tournament to the tenth tournament. In the 9th tournament, Japan and China lined up side by side, but due to discussions between the two sides, it was decided that no rematch would be held, and both teams were treated as winners.

Results

Summary

Note: All matches played before the founding of the Chinese Football Association in 1924 are not counted as A-level matches by FIFA.

Medals

All-time top goalscorers

Hat-tricks

References

External links
  远东运动会资料库 (Far Eastern Championship Games Database)
 Far Eastern Championship Games Football Overview at RSSSF.com

 
Defunct international association football competitions
International association football competitions in Asia
Far Eastern Championship Games
Far Eastern Championship Games